Keliximab is a monoclonal antibody for the treatment of severe chronic asthma. It suppresses the immune reaction by binding to white blood cells via the protein  CD4. The drug is a chimeric antibody from Macaca irus and Homo sapiens.

References 

Monoclonal antibodies